John Theodore Callimachi (1690–1780) was Prince of Moldavia from 1758 to 1761.

Early years
Ioan was the second son of Teodor Calmăşul.  Teodor, born Calmăşul, changed the family name to the Greek form Callimachi (Καλλιμάχης). Ioan's older brother, Gavriil Callimachi (1689–1786) was a monk at Putna Monastery. Ioan pursued his studies at Lvov. He knew Latin, Turkish, Italian, Greek and French.

Career
Callimachi served in the administrations of John Mavrocordatos and of Grigore II Ghica. He was Grand Dragoman at the Ottoman Porte in Istanbul where, over the course of his sixteen years of service, he was recognized for his diplomatic ability. In 1758, he was rewarded with the position of Prince of Moldavia which he held until 1761. Callimachi retired to Constantinople where he lived for 19 years before his death.

Personal life
Callimachi married Ralitsa Chrysoskoleos and they had four children.  Their son, Gregory Callimachi (1735–1769), succeeded Callimachi as Prince of Moldavia; and son Alexander Callimachi (1737–1821) was Prince of Moldavia before the turn of the century.  Their elder daughter, Sevastiţa (born 1736), married Mihai Suţu; the   younger daughter was called  Maria (1740–1831).

References

Nita Dan Danielescu. "Gavriil Callimachi, ctitorul Catedralei mitropolitane Sf. Gheorghe din Iasi" Ziarul Lumina, 2006-02-20

John Theodore
Dragomans of the Porte
Rulers of Moldavia
1690 births
1780 deaths
18th-century translators
18th-century people from the Ottoman Empire